Sfeçël (in Albanian) or Svećnje (in Serbian) is a village in the municipality of Podujevo, Kosovo.

Notes

References

Villages in Podujevo